This is a list of the members of the Australian House of Representatives in the Second Australian Parliament, which was elected on 16 December 1903.

Notes
* These candidates were elected unopposed.

Members of Australian parliaments by term
20th-century Australian politicians